The Dugites were an Australian rock band who formed in the late 1970s and went on to record three albums in the early 1980s. The Dugites combined elements of power pop, new wave and electronic, producing songs with strong melodies, hooks and a smattering of politics. With hit singles "In Your Car", "Waiting" and "Juno and Me", they received extensive airplay, appearances on Countdown and toured nationally around Australia. The band's name refers to the brown venomous snake, the dugite, common to Western Australia.

History
The Dugites formed in Perth in 1978 with a line-up of Lynda Nutter on vocals, Peter Crosbie on keyboards, Gunther Berghoffer on guitar, Phillip Bailey on bass and Clarence Bailey on drums. In 1979 The Dugites released a single "Hit Single"/"Bruce", and toured as the backing band for Dave Warner.  The single had been self-financed, but that year they were signed by the Deluxe label distributed by RCA Records. In 1980 Paul Noonan (ex-Dave Warner's from the Suburbs) replaced Phillip Bailey. Their first album The Dugites was released in June 1980 and reached No. 22 on the Australian Album charts. It went on to attain gold status (35 000 copies sold). Three singles were issued from the album, "In Your Car"/"13 Again" in May 1980, which reached No. 34 on the Australian Singles charts in July, "Goodbye"/"No God, No Master" in July and "South Pacific"/"Gay Guys" in October, which reached No. 90. At the 1980 Countdown Music Awards both The Dugites and Nutter received nominations for 'Best New Talent' and 'Most Popular Female' respectively. In December the band were the opening act for Elton John's concert at the Perth Entertainment Centre.
  
The band's second album, West Of The World which, like the first, was produced by Bob Andrews (Graham Parker and the Rumour), was released in July 1981. The album peaked at No. 33 on the Australian album charts and saw the release of two singles, "Waiting"/"Who Loves You More?", in May 1981, which reached No. 40 and "Part of Me"/"Never Touch" in September. In mid 1982 Berghoffer left the band and was replaced by guitarist Andrew Pendlebury (ex-The Sports), following which the band issued a single, "No Money"/"Decide" in July on the Rough Diamond label, and the related mini-album, No Money in August. Pendlebury was then replaced by Bob Fallovic (aka Boris Garter; ex-Stockings) and Paul Williamson also joined on saxophone. By mid-1983 however the line-up was reduced to Nutter, Crosbie, Bailey and Noonan. In 1985 after several appearances on TV's Hey Hey It's Saturday, Bailey and Nutter stayed to live in Melbourne a while, where Bailey played drums in an Afro Reaggae Band called 'Randy and JahRoots' featuring Ghanaian star Randy Borquaye and drummer-congero Dezzy 'Animal' McKenna from the tv show Hey Hey It's Saturday.

The Dugites signed to Mercury/PolyGram and released their third album, Cut The Talking, in April 1984. Three singles were released from the album, "Cut the Talking"/"Michael and Rodney", in November 1983, "Juno and Me"/"Everything Must Change" in April 1984, which reached No. 60 on the Australian Singles charts, and "It Ain't Like That"/"All That I Want" in August. Following the release of the album the band added Peter Kaldor on saxophone and John Crosbie on trombone and trumpet to the line-up for touring purposes, but at the end of 1984 the group disbanded.

When the ABC's Sydney 'youth' radio station Double Jay was launched in 1975, Skyhooks' "You Just Like Me Cos I'm Good In Bed" was chosen as the opening song played on air, specifically because it had been banned by Australian commercial radio. When Double Jay switched bands to FM in 1980, The Dugites' "Gay Guys", which had also been banned by commercial radio, became the first song to be played by Double Jay's successor, 2JJJ-FM Triple J.

Members
 Lynda Nutter – vocals, percussion (1978–84)
 Gunther Berghofer – guitar, vocals (1978–83)
 Peter Crosbie – keyboards, vocals (1978–84)
 Clarence Bailey – drums, vocals (1978–84)
 Philip Bailey - bass vocals (1978–80)
 Paul Noonan – bass, vocals (1980–84)
 Andrew Pendlebury – guitar (1982–83)
 Robert Fallovic - guitar (1983)
 Paul Williamson - saxophone (1983)

Snakefish
The Dugites were asked to be one of a number of Perth bands of the 1970s and 1980s to be part of 2004's Old Day Out in Fremantle. Nutter recruited Perth keyboard player Kathy Travers and guitarist Richard Leach to join with Dugites members Clarence Bailey and Phil Bailey. The Old Day Out gig was a success and led to a new band, Snakefish, with Nutter on vocals, Clarence Bailey on drums, Phil Bailey on bass with Cathie Travers, piano accordion, and Richard Leach on guitar.

Discography

Studio albums

Compilation albums

EPs

Singles

Awards and nominations

TV Week / Countdown Awards
Countdown was an Australian pop music TV series on national broadcaster ABC-TV from 1974–1987, it presented music awards from 1979–1987, initially in conjunction with magazine TV Week. The TV Week / Countdown Awards were a combination of popular-voted and peer-voted awards.

|-
| rowspan="2" | 1980
| Themselves
| Best New Talent
| 
|-
| Lynda Nutter (The Dugites)
| Most Popular Female
| 
|-

References

External links
 Site with more information on The Dugites

Western Australian musical groups
Musical groups established in 1978
Musical groups disestablished in 1984